Hanburia gloriosa is a corynexochid trilobite known from the Middle Cambrian Burgess Shale. Four specimens of Hanburia gloriosa are known from the Greater Phyllopod bed, where they comprise < 0.1% of the community.

References

External links
 

Burgess Shale fossils
Dolichometopidae
Cambrian trilobites